McKinley High School is a public high school located in Sebring, Ohio. It is the only high school in the district, and educates 185 students enrolled in grades 6 through 12.  In 1914, the Sebring Local School District was established and charged with strengthening the educational opportunities for students in the village of Sebring and the surrounding area. The Sebring Local School District built the current McKinley High School in Sebring in the late 1990s.

Sebring School Board
Current members as of 2022-23 School Year:
Melinda Vecchio
JoAnn Jones
Tracie McFerren
Scott Latham
Debra Green

Sports

Sebring McKinley is a member of the Mahoning Valley Athletic Conference of the Ohio High School Athletic Association (OHSAA), and participates in golf, cross country running, volleyball, football, boys/girls basketball, baseball, softball, boys/girls track and cheerleading.

Beginning with the 2023 season, Sebring McKinley's football team will begin 8-man play in the Northern 8 Football Conference.

OHSAA State Champions
 Girls Cheerleading- 2006, 2007, 2008, 2010, 2011
OHSAA State Runner-Up
 Boys Basketball- 1970
OHSAA State Semi-Finalist 
 Boys Basketball- 1973, 2004

School Activities/Clubs

 Clubs offered include: Yearbook, School Newspaper ‘The Echo’, Ecology Club, Language Club, SADD, Academic Challenge/Quiz Bowl, Student Senate, and The ‘Semper Fidelis’ Chapter of NHS.
 The Ecology Club participates in community service projects including trips outside of Sebring to the Stark County Humane Society. 
 The Student Senate is an advisory committee that also takes charge of several school programs.
 The Language Club is active in National Foreign Language Week held in mid-March.
 SADD focuses on student well-being and mentors students.
 The National Honor Society recognizes those students who exemplified the qualities of Character, Leadership, Scholarship and Service. 
 The Drama department puts on a show in November. 
 The school has a Marching Band with nearly 20% of the school population enrolled. They play at all of the school’s football games, as well as two Marching Band Shows a year. 
 The Pep Band plays at 4 or 5 basketball home games a year that occur on Friday nights. 
 The Concert Band performs three shows a year, in December, March and May. They also perform at band shows and offer opportunities for students to participate in the OMEA District 5 Honors Band and Solo and Ensemble contests. 
 The Choral program performs three to four shows a year starting in December. They are offered opportunities to compete in the OMEA Solo and Ensemble contests.

Notable alumni
 Judith L. French - Ohio Supreme Court Judge
 Rose Mary Woods - Personal secretary to President Richard Nixon.

References

External links
 District Website

High schools in Mahoning County, Ohio
Public high schools in Ohio
Educational institutions established in 1914
1914 establishments in Ohio